Maria Ivanovna Stavitskaia (born 1 September 1997) is a Russian former competitive figure skater. She is the 2013 Ukrainian Open silver medalist, 2012 JGP Germany bronze medalist, and a two-time Cup of Nice junior champion.

Career 
In the 2011–12 season, Stavitskaia finished 6th in her ISU Junior Grand Prix event in Estonia and won the junior event at 2011 Cup of Nice.

Assigned to two 2012–13 JGP events, Stavitskaia finished 7th in Austria and won the bronze medal in Germany. She then won her second Cup of Nice junior title and ended her season with the gold medal at the 2013 European Youth Winter Olympic Festival.

Stavitskaia won the silver medal in her senior international debut at the 2013 Ukrainian Open.

On 5 June 2015 it was announced that Stavitskaia had decided to switch divisions from ladies singles to ice dance, and would start skating with Anton Shibnev as her partner, coached by Alexander Zhulin. In summer 2016 it became known that Stavitskaia and Andrei Bagin would skate together in season 2016–17.

Programs

Competitive highlights

Ice dance with Bagin

Ice dance with Shibnev

Singles career 
GP: Grand Prix; JGP: Junior Grand Prix

References

External links 

 
 Maria Stavitskaia at sport-folio.net

Russian female single skaters
1997 births
Living people
Figure skaters from Saint Petersburg
People from Melitopol
Russian people of Ukrainian descent
Competitors at the 2017 Winter Universiade